The Page Unified School District is the school district for Page, Arizona, United States. It operates Desert View and Lake View elementary schools, Page Middle School, and Page High School. The superintendent is Rob Varner.

The district serves a portion of Page as well as Bitter Springs, LeChee and most of Kaibito CDP.

References

External links
 

School districts in Coconino County, Arizona
Page, Arizona
Education on the Navajo Nation